Modrzewie is a village in the administrative district of Gmina Wleń, within Lwówek Śląski County, Lower Silesian Voivodeship, in south-western Poland.

References

Modrzewie